The third season of Reign, an American historical fantasy, consisted of 18 episodes which aired between October 9, 2015 and June 20, 2016.  The series, created by Stephanie SenGupta and Laurie McCarthy, aired on The CW.

On January 11, 2015, The CW renewed the series for a third season. At The CW's 2015-16 Upfront, it was announced that the series would be moving to a different night, airing on Fridays at 8/7c, instead of Thursdays at 9/8c. The latter half of the season, from episode 11 onward, returned on April 25 in a new Monday timeslot before Jane the Virgin.

Season overview

The season follows King Francis' declining health and death partway through the season, leaving Mary a widow and struggling to find new footing since she's no longer bound to France as its queen. Francis' younger brother Charles is crowned the new underage king, with Catherine as regent.
Also introduces the court of Queen Elizabeth Tudor of England who plots against Queen Mary, fends off marital prospects, and deals with her secret love affair with Lord Robert Dudley.

Cast and characters

Main
 Adelaide Kane as Queen Mary Stuart
 Toby Regbo as King Francis II 
 Megan Follows as Queen Catherine
 Rachel Skarsten as Queen Elizabeth I of England 
 Torrance Coombs as Sebastian "Bash" de Poitiers
 Celina Sinden as Greer 
 Anna Popplewell as Lady Lola 
 Jonathan Keltz as Leith Bayard
 Craig Parker as Stéphane Narcisse 
 Rose Williams as Claude of France
 Charlie Carrick as Robert Dudley 
 Ben Geurens as Gideon Blackburn

Recurring
 Alexandra Ordolis as Delphine 
 Spencer MacPherson as Charles IX of France
 Clara Pasieka as Amy Dudley 
 Tom Everett Scott as William 
 Nick Lee as Nicholas 
 Mark Ghanimé as Don Carlos of Spain 
 Nathaniel Middleton as Christophe 
 Dan Jeannotte as James Stewart

Guest
 Rossif Sutherland as Nostradamus 
 Amy Brenneman as Queen Marie de Guise 
 Michael Therriault as Aloysius Castleroy
 Ben Aldridge as King Antoine
 John Barrowman as Munro, leader of the McFee

Episodes

References

2015 American television seasons
2016 American television seasons